The 1956 Massachusetts gubernatorial election was held on November 6, 1956.  Democrat Foster Furcolo was elected Governor of Massachusetts to replace incumbent Christian Herter, who did not run for re-election. Furcolo defeated Republican Sumner G. Whittier, Socialist Labor candidate Henning A. Blomen, and Prohibition candidate Mark R. Shaw.

In the race for lieutenant governor, Democrat Robert F. Murphy defeated  Republican Charles Gibbons, Prohibition candidate Harold E. Bassett, and Socialist Labor candidate Francis A. Votano.

Republican primary

Candidates 
 Sumner Whittier, Lieutenant Governor of Massachusetts

Results 
Lt. Governor Whittier was unopposed in the Republican primary.

Democratic primary

Candidates
 Thomas H. Buckley, former Massachusetts Auditor
 Foster Furcolo, former Treasurer and Receiver-General of Massachusetts

Results

General election

Results

See also 
 1955–1956 Massachusetts legislature

References

1956
Gubernatorial
1956 United States gubernatorial elections
November 1956 events in the United States